Oscarshall Palace is a maison de plaisance located in the small fjord Frognerkilen on Bygdøy in Oslo, Norway.

History 
The palace was built from 1847 to 1852 by the Danish architect Johan Henrik Nebelong on commission from King Oscar I and Queen Joséphine of Norway and Sweden. In 1881, King Oscar II opened the palace to the public as a museum.

The palace, with its secondary buildings and surrounding park, is considered to be one of the finest examples of neo-Gothic architecture in Norway and is one of the country's most important embodiments of the National Romantic style which was popular in Norway during the period.

The interior was wholly constructed and decorated by Norwegian artists and artisans. The walls of the dining hall are decorated with paintings by Joachim Frich and Adolph Tidemand, while the decoration and furniture in the drawing room evokes the style of the old Norwegian guildhall.

Oscarshall was sold by King Carl IV to the Norwegian state in 1863. The palace was almost given a new role when it was decided in 1929 that Oscarshall would become the new residence of Crown Prince Olav and Princess Märtha. These plans were never realized, however, as both financial problems and political opposition arose. The situation was later solved when Fritz Wedel Jarlsberg sold his estate Skaugum to the royal couple. Today it is the property of the state and is placed at the disposal of the King.

Open to the public 
Between 2005 and 2009 Oscarshall underwent a total renovation and restoration, bringing colours and furniture back to its original style from 1859. The renovation completed, Oscarshall was once again open to the public.

The palace is now open for guided tours during the summer season. In 2013, Queen Sonja opened the Queen Joséphine Gallery on the grounds of Oscarshall. The gallery exhibits graphic prints and featured prints by Her Majesty herself during its first season.

Additional images

References

Related reading
Hjelde, Gunnar; Oscarshall – lystslottet på Bygdøy, Oslo 1978
Neubert. Poul J.; «Artikkel om Lystslottet Oscarshall» i Architectura (DK) 2006, (utgis av "Selskabet for Arkitekturhistorie")
Nina Høye: Oscarshall. Oslo, Cappelen Damm, 2009 
Trond Norén Isaksen: Det undersköna Oscarshall – hoffliv på sommerslottet i 1855. Byminner'', nr. 3–2010, side 2–11

External links 

 Oscarshall (Website of The Royal House of Norway)
 Guided tours (Website of The Royal House of Norway)
 The History of Oscarshall (Website of The Royal House of Norway)

Bygdøy
Buildings and structures in Oslo
Palaces in Norway
Royal residences in Norway
Museums in Oslo
Gothic Revival architecture in Norway
1852 establishments in Norway
Historic house museums in Norway